Wayne Chernecki (August 12, 1949—February 11, 2013) was a Canadian ice hockey player who played professionally from 1971 to 1975.

Career
Chernecki played junior hockey with the Winnipeg Jets of the Western Canada Hockey League.  In his final season with the Jets, he was one of the league's most prolific scorers, amassing 123 points in only 65 games.

The Detroit Red Wings selected Chernecki in the 4th round (#45) of the 1969 NHL Amateur Draft; however he choose to remain with the Jets and pursue a business degree.  After graduating from university in 1971, Chernecki turned pro and went on to play 263 regular season games in the American Hockey League with the Springfield Kings and Providence Reds.  A serious knee injury forced him to retire in 1975.

Post career
After retiring as a player, Chernecki coached in the Manitoba Junior Hockey League, leading the St. James Canadians to consecutive league titles.  At the same time, he built a successful career as a businessman, becoming an executive in David Thomson's business empire and serving on the board of directors for True North Sports & Entertainment.

Personal
Chernecki died of lung cancer on February 11, 2013, at the age of 63.  Chernecki was posthumously inducted into the Manitoba Hockey Hall of Fame.

Career statistics

External links
 
 Profile at HockeyDraftCentral.com

References

1949 births
2013 deaths
Canadian ice hockey centres
Detroit Red Wings draft picks
Providence Reds players
Ice hockey people from Winnipeg
Springfield Kings players
University of Manitoba alumni
Winnipeg Jets (WHL) players